The women's 200 metres event at the 2004 World Junior Championships in Athletics was held in Grosseto, Italy, at Stadio Olimpico Carlo Zecchini on 15 and 16 July.

Medalists

Results

Final
16 July
Wind: -0.2 m/s

Semifinals
15 July

Semifinal 1
Wind: +0.7 m/s

Semifinal 2
Wind: +0.7 m/s

Semifinal 3
Wind: +0.5 m/s

Heats
15 July

Heat 1
Wind: +0.5 m/s

Heat 2
Wind: +0.1 m/s

Heat 3
Wind: +1.3 m/s

Heat 4
Wind: +0.3 m/s

Heat 5
Wind: +1.2 m/s

Heat 6
Wind: +0.5 m/s

Participation
According to an unofficial count, 41 athletes from 33 countries participated in the event.

References

200 metres
200 metres at the World Athletics U20 Championships